William James Eglinski (born December 15, 1948) is a Canadian politician who represented the riding of Yellowhead from 2014 to 2019 as a member of the Conservative Party.

Background

Eglinski was born in Two Hills, Alberta and raised in Chipman, Alberta on a farm. He worked for 40 years as a Royal Canadian Mounted Police officer, and served as a councillor and eventually mayor for the town of Fort St. John, British Columbia.

Federal Politics

Eglinski was first elected to represent the riding Yellowhead in a 2014 by-election.

He was re-elected in the 2015 Canadian federal election with over 70 percent of the vote. In the 42nd Canadian Parliament, his Conservative Party formed the Official Opposition. While he was not assigned to a critic role, Eglinski did introduce one private member bill into the House of Commons, An Act to amend the Criminal Code (abuse of vulnerable persons) (Bill C-206), which sought to make physical, emotional, sexual or financial abuse of a senior or someone who depends on others due to a mental or physical disability to be an aggravating circumstance for sentencing purposes. The bill was introduced on December 10, 2015, but did not advance to second reading.

In 2016, Eglinski surprised many by participating in the flag-raising to kick off Pride Week in Jasper, Alberta, a rare move for a Conservative MP. Acknowledging that he once opposed condoning homosexuality and saw no need for LGBT pride celebration, Eglinski credited his change of heart to the coming-out of one of his grandchildren.

In the 2017 Conservative Party leadership contest, Eglinski initially endorsed eventual winner Andrew Scheer, but later switched his endorsement to Erin O'Toole.

In late 2017, Eglinski faced nomination challenge for re-election from Ryan Ouderkirk, a parliamentary assistant to fellow MP David Yurdiga. "Surprised" by and "not happy" with the challenge, Eglinski announced in January 2018 that he would not seek re-election in 2019.

Electoral record

References

External links

1948 births
British Columbia municipal councillors
Conservative Party of Canada MPs
Living people
Mayors of places in British Columbia
Members of the House of Commons of Canada from Alberta
People from Edson, Alberta
People from Fort St. John, British Columbia
People from Two Hills, Alberta
Royal Canadian Mounted Police officers
21st-century Canadian politicians